The coat of arms of Kiribati, officially known as the National Emblem of Kiribati, is the heraldic symbol representing the Central Pacific island nation of Kiribati. The arms feature a yellow frigatebird over a rising sun on a red background among white and blue stripes (symbol of the Pacific) and the 3 groups of stripes represent (Gilbert, Phoenix and Line Islands). The 17 rays of the sun represent the 16 Gilbert Islands and Banaba (former Ocean Island). On the ribbon under the shield is the Gilbertese motto Te Mauri te Raoi ao te Tabomoa (Health, Peace, and Prosperity). The previous motto of the British Colony (1937–1979) was "Fear God, Honour the King" (both in Gilbertese, Maaka te Atua, Karinea te Uea; or Tuvaluan, Mataku i te Atua, Fakamamalu ki te Tupu).

After being drawn by Sir Arthur Grimble in 1932, the coat of arms was granted by the College of Arms on 1 May 1937 to the Gilbert and Ellice Islands, then British Colony, which paid £25 for it, and was adapted as the official coat of arms of Kiribati in 1979 with the new motto.

The same motif is seen on the flag of Kiribati.

Sources
 Minahan, James, 2010: The Complete Guide to National Symbols and Emblems (2 vols); Kiribati: p 79 (text;Googlebooks) and p 282 (image; Googlebooks) ABC-CLIO LLC. 
 Heraldry of the World: Kiribati

National symbols of Kiribati
Kiribati
Kiribati
Kiribati
Kiribati
Kiribati
Kiribati